Proctor is an unincorporated community in Lake County, Montana, United States. The community has a ZIP code 59929.

It is near Skags Lake.

History
In 1869, Kootenai settlement began in the Proctor area, and a federal commissary opened there. Clarence E. Proctor, for whom the community is named, founded a ranch and opened a store at Proctor in 1883. The town was known as Dayton until 1910, when many of the town's residents relocated to the current site of Dayton due to its shorefront location on Flathead Lake; the old townsite then acquired its current name.

References

Unincorporated communities in Lake County, Montana
Unincorporated communities in Montana